Graham Frank Moss (born 14 May 1950) is a former Australian rules footballer who played for the Essendon Football Club in the Victorian Football League (VFL) and for the Claremont Football Club in the West Australian Football League (WAFL). 

A Legend in the West Australian Football Hall of Fame, Moss is recognized as one of the finest ruckmen of his era, winning the Brownlow Medal and then returning to Western Australia, eventually captain-coaching Claremont to the 1981 premiership.

After finishing his on-field career, Moss became a respected football administrator, most notably serving as the inaugural chief executive officer of the West Coast Eagles.

Football Career
Moss debuted for Claremont Football Club in the WAFL in 1969. In 1970, he made his debut for the Western Australian state team.

Essendon attempted to lure him to Melbourne several times, and finally succeeded before the 1973 season. In his first game, the opening round at Windy Hill against Richmond, Moss made an immediate impression, appropriately enough following an austere pre-game ceremony when the Essendon club held a minute's silence in honour of past legend John Coleman who died some days earlier, and who also famously made an sensational debut. Moss played 89 games for Essendon, winning the club best and fairest three times, in 1974–76. He also represented Victoria 5 times. In 1976, he captained Essendon and won the Brownlow, but also suffered a serious knee injury. Moss has the second-highest average of Brownlow Medal votes (0.95 per game) of any player ever polled for the award.

He was appointed captain-coach by Claremont in 1977, and commented that his return from Essendon to Claremont was made easy by the fact the VFL and WANFL were of a similar standard at the time. That same year he won the Simpson Medal, while playing for Western Australia against Victoria. Moss led Claremont to a premiership, their first in 17 years, in 1981, and apart from the first two and last two years his tenure with the Tigers was their first period of consistent success since the days of Johnny Leonard’s coaching. Moss ceased playing in 1983 but returned for a few matches in 1985, and retired as coach at the end of the 1986 season to be replaced by Gerard Neesham.

The Graham Moss Medal has been awarded to the best on ground in WAFL State of Origin matches from 1995.

In 1996, Moss was inducted into the Australian Football Hall of Fame.  In 2004, he was inducted into the West Australian Football Hall of Fame and elevated to the status of "Legend" in 2006.

Outside Football

Moss attended Hollywood Senior High School and later graduated with an Associateship in Civil Engineering from the West Australian Institute of Technology in 1971. Moss has served in various administration roles. He was the inaugural chief executive officer of the West Australian Sports Centre Trust from 1986 to 2008. The Trust, now VenuesWest, owns and manages major sport, entertainment and recreation venues on behalf of the Government of Western Australia. He was also the CEO of Tourism WA between 2008 and 2011, and is now a project management consultant for Auzcorp Pty Ltd, who are a property developer and services provider to the Pilbara Region of WA. Moss still lives in Perth, Western Australia.

Moss was honoured with Life Membership at Essendon in March 2015.

Champions of Essendon 
In 2002 an Essendon panel ranked him at 17 in their Champions of Essendon list of the 25 greatest players ever to have played for Essendon.

References

External links
 
 
 Australian Football Hall of Fame - Players
 Profile at WA Football Hall of Fame website
 Player statistics at WAFL FootyFacts

1950 births
Living people
Claremont Football Club players
Essendon Football Club players
Champions of Essendon
Brownlow Medal winners
Australian Football Hall of Fame inductees
Western Australian State of Origin players
Crichton Medal winners
Claremont Football Club coaches
Australian rules footballers from Western Australia
West Australian Football Hall of Fame inductees